Beau Brummell (1778–1840) was an arbiter of fashion in Regency England.

Beau Brummell or The Beau Brummells may also refer to:
Beau Brummel (1913 film), a silent short film by and starring James Young
Beau Brummel (1924 film), a silent film
Beau Brummell (1954 film)
Beau Brummell, play by Clyde Fitch (premiered on May 17, 1890 in New York)
The Beau Brummels, a 1960s American rock band
The Beau Brummels (album) (1975)
The Beau Brummels (film), a 1928 comedy short film starring Al Shaw & Sam Lee
Paul Roland or Beau Brummell (born 1959), English songwriter

Brummell, Beau